Events in the year 2018 in Burkina Faso.

Incumbents
 President: Roch Marc Christian Kaboré 
 Prime Minister: Paul Kaba Thieba

Events
2 March – 2018 Ouagadougou attacks

Deaths

18 February – Idrissa Ouédraogo, film director (b. 1954).

References

 
2010s in Burkina Faso
Years of the 21st century in Burkina Faso
Burkina Faso 
Burkina Faso